This is a list of lighthouses in Republic of the Congo.

Lighthouses

See also
List of lighthouses in Gabon (to the north-west)
List of lighthouses in Angola (to the south)
 Lists of lighthouses and lightvessels

References

External links

Congo Republic
Lighthouses
Lighthouses